This page lists the discography of American musical duo Daryl Hall & John Oates.

In the US, the band has had eight albums certified platinum (including three double platinum) and an additional six albums certified gold by the RIAA. They have also had six singles certified gold. Certifications have totaled 14 million albums and six million singles.

Albums

Studio albums

Live albums

Compilation albums

Singles

Guest singles

Other appearances

Music videos

Explanatory notes

Citations

External links
 "Daryl Hall: Interview from Daryl's House" by Pete Lewis, Blues & Soul, July 2008
 

Discography
Discographies of American artists
Pop music group discographies